Prime Suspect is an American police procedural drama television series that aired on NBC from September 22, 2011, to January 22, 2012. It stars Maria Bello as Detective Jane Timoney. The series was a "re-imagining" of the original British series Prime Suspect. The series was created by Lynda La Plante and developed by Alexandra Cunningham, who also serves as executive producer and writer. Peter Berg serves as executive producer and director. Sarah Aubrey, Julie Meldal-Johnson, Paul Buccieri, Lynda La Plante, and John McNamara all serve as executive producers. The series is produced by Universal Television, ITV Studios America, and Film 44.

On November 14, 2011, NBC announced it would replace Prime Suspect in the Thursday night line-up with The Firm, beginning January 12, 2012. The final two produced episodes were broadcast by NBC on Sunday, January 22, 2012. The Firm also struggled in the time slot, and was moved within four weeks to a different time slot and replaced by another new series, Awake; Awake was another ratings failure, and all three series were cancelled that season.

Synopsis
Produced by Peter Berg and Alexandra Cunningham, the crime drama Prime Suspect takes place within a New York City Police Department homicide squad. The series stars Maria Bello as NYPD homicide detective Jane Timoney, an outsider who has just transferred to a new squad where her new colleagues already dislike her. Jane is confident and focused, but also rude, abrupt and occasionally reckless. She has her vices, and rumors about how she got the job follow her everywhere.

Cast and characters
Maria Bello as Det. Jane Timoney
Brían F. O'Byrne as Det. Reg Duffy
Kirk Acevedo as Det. Luisito Calderon
Peter Gerety as Desmond Timoney, Jane's father.
Tim Griffin as Det. Augie Blando
Damon Gupton as Det. Evrard Velerio
 Elizabeth Rodriguez appeared as Det. Carolina Rivera (four episodes)
Joe Nieves as Det. Eddie Gautier (pilot only)
Kenny Johnson as Matt Webb
Aidan Quinn as Lt. Kevin Sweeney

Development and production
An American remake of the UK series was previously ordered by NBC in September 2009 as part of a two-year, three pilot deal with ITV Studios. Hank Steinberg, the creator of the CBS Without a Trace series, was set to write and executive produce the two-hour pilot. In early 2010, Erwin Stoff and Paul Buccieri were to also serve as executive producers—for ITV Studios and Universal Media Studios—and Mick Jackson was on board to direct. By late February, the project was put on hold because reportedly an actress could not be found to play the lead character. In July 2010, Universal Media Studios signed a new deal with Film 44, the production company of Peter Berg and Sarah Aubrey. As part of the agreement, they took over the development of Prime Suspect. "We are proud to continue our productive creative relationship with Peter and Sarah in developing Prime Suspect, among others… They have immense talent and passion".
  
In early 2011, NBC gave the green light to produce a pilot script. In late May, NBC announced that Prime Suspect would premiere on Thursday September 22, 2011.

It was announced in early August that Maria Bello would star as the main character of Det. Jane Timoney. The series was filmed in Los Angeles although it is set in New York City.

Episodes

Ratings

Reception
The series premiere was viewed by 6.05 million viewers with a 1.8 rating in the 18–49 demographic. The series has received generally positive reviews from critics and viewers. The series received 66/100 based upon 26 reviews on the website Metacritic indicating the series as generally favourable. Most critics found Maria Bello's performance the strongest factor of the series praising her excellent and intriguing portrayal of Det. Jane Timoney. Mo Fathelbab of BuzzFocus said, "I'm going to go out on a limb and say that the American version of Prime Suspect is my favorite new hour-long show on network television. It may very well be the best new show premiering this fall. It's a smart, un-condescending cop show that is anchored by a fantastic performance by Maria Bello". Eric Blattberg said, "What makes Prime Suspect compelling enough to see where this show goes is its remarkable cast. This show is not actually bad at all; it's an enjoyable hour, but it's going to need a lot of work to avoid being lost in the shuffle amongst other established police shows. Not to mention the fact that it's up against Thursday heavyweights".

On October 4, 2011, NBC announced that the show's first three episodes would be rerun on Monday nights for the month of October, following the cancellation of The Playboy Club.

International distribution

References

External links

 

2010s American crime drama television series
2010s American police procedural television series
2011 American television series debuts
2012 American television series endings
American television series based on British television series
English-language television shows
Fictional portrayals of the New York City Police Department
NBC original programming
Television series by ITV Studios
Television series by Universal Television
Television shows set in New York City